Iru Power Plant is a co-generation power plant in Iru village, Maardu, Estonia. It is owned by Enefit Green, a subsidiary of Eesti Energia.

History
The first unit of power plant was commissioned in 1978. In the beginning it operated as a boiler plant. In 1980, it was converted into co-generation power plant.

Old units

The power plant has three power units with capacities of 80 MWe, 110 MWe and 17 MWe. The primary fuel of the units 1 and 2 is natural gas and reserve fuel is fuel oil, unit 3 mixed municipal waste. In co-generation mode the heating capacity is 398 MWt. It supplies heat to Maardu, and the Lasnamäe and central districts of Tallinn.

Waste-to-energy unit
In 2006, Eesti Energia started preparations for construction of a waste incineration unit with capacity of 50 MW of heat and 17 MW of electricity.  Construction started in 2010.  It was commissioned on 16 June 2013.  The unit processes up to 220,000 tonnes of mixed municipal waste per year.  The unit was built and technology was provided by Constructions industrielles de la Méditerranée (CNIM).  The general construction was carried out by Merko Ehitus, with the incineration grate supplied by Martin GmbH and the system for the treatment of waste gas by LAB, a subsidiary of CNIM.  The unit cost about €105 million.

Trivia
The director of Iru Power Plant from 2002 to 2004, Kersti Kaljulaid, the first woman to lead a power plant in Estonia, became the fifth President of Estonia in 2016, and the first woman to be President since the country declared independence in 1918.

See also

 Energy in Estonia

References

External links

 

Energy infrastructure completed in 1978
Natural-gas fired power stations in Estonia
Oil-fired power stations in Estonia
Waste power stations in Estonia
Cogeneration power stations in Estonia
Buildings and structures in Harju County